Mike Elliott is a saxophonist who was born in Jamaica on 6 August 1929. He played on ska recordings in the early 1960s and on pop and soul music hits in the late 1960s. He is best known as a co-founding member of the British band The Foundations, and played on their hit singles "Baby, Now That I've Found You" and "Build Me Up Buttercup".

Biography

Early 1960s
Elliott was a member of Rico's Combo who were a house / studio band led by Jamaican trombonist Rico Rodriguez. Besides Rodriguez on Trombone and Elliott on saxophone, the band included another saxophonist Lovett Brown and Jackie Edwards on piano etc. They played on early 1960s Jamaican Ska recordings issued on the Planetone label such as "Hitch & Scramble" (recorded in 1962).

He had also recorded a handful of records under his own name, two of them on the Planetone label in 1963. These two Planetone singles were shared with other artists. His recording "This Love of Mine" appeared on the flip side of Terry Moon's "Moon Man" and it would actually appear again later appear on the Carnival label in 1964 as the flip side to Young Satchmo's "Things Are Getting Better".

He had also been a member of The Cabin Boys, led by Colin Hicks the brother of British rock 'n' roll singer Tommy Steele, and had played with jazz saxophonists Tubby Hayes and Ronnie Scott.

Mid to late 1960s
By 1967 he was a member of the multi-racial English soul group The Foundations who had million selling hits with "Baby, Now That I've Found You" and "Build Me Up Buttercup" etc. At 38 years of age he was the oldest member of the group and was nearly 20 years older than the youngest member of the group 18-year-old Tim Harris. He was part of their three-man brass section playing Tenor Sax alongside fellow Jamaican tenor saxophonist and flautist Pat Burke and Dominican trombonist Eric Allandale. He played on their first three hit singles, "Baby, Now That I've Found You", "Back on My Feet Again" and "Any Old Time (You're Lonely And Sad)". He also played on their PYE debut album "From The Foundations", a live album "Rocking The Foundations" and on three Foundations tracks at a John Peel session in January 1968.

In 1968 The Foundations were experiencing some problems within their group as well as problems with their songwriter and producer Tony Macaulay who wouldn't allow them to record their own compositions. Around that time the band had recorded a track called "It's All Right", a live favourite of theirs and quite possibly the last Foundations recording he played on. He left around the same time as the Foundations lead singer Clem Curtis, who left to pursue a solo career. 
Some sources say that Elliott's departure signalled the internal dissatisfaction. He wasn't replaced.

1970s
In 1972 Elliott had a Reggae styled single, "Milk & Honey" released on the Ackee record label. The flip-side was "Burst A Shirt" which is credited to Mike Elliot With Harvey And Errol. "Milk And Honey" would turn up as the flip side of Junior English's "One And Only" which was produced by Lord Koos.

It is also rumored that Elliott had some involvement with another Reggae single released on Supreme SUP 225 by Eugene And Burst and backed with a track by Denzil And Burst. The songs were "Let It Fall" on side 1 and "Can't Change" on side 2. This was released on the label in 1971. The Denzil on this recording is Denzil Dennis. Elliott along with Eddie "Tan Tan" Thornton and Sonny Burke had previously recorded with Denzil Dennis.

Discography

Singles
 Terry Moon – "Moon Man" / Mike Elliot – "This Love of Mine" – Planetone RC11, 1963
 Basil John – "Drink And Drive" /Mike Elliott – "J.K. Shuffle" – Planetone RC12, 1963
 Mike Elliott – "This Love of Mine" / Young Satchmo – "Things Are Getting Better" – Carnival CV 7008, 1964
 Mike Elliott – "Milk & Honey" / Mike Elliott & Errol – "Burst A Shirt" – Ackee ACK151, 1972
 Junior English – "One And Only Lover" / Mike Elliott – "Milk & Honey" – Gee's Records GE45-1053

Compilation
 "This Love of Mine" appears on the various artists compilation – The Ska's The Limit – Carnival CX 1000 
 "Milk And Honey" appears on a Various Artists album – Slim Smith – The Memory of Slim Smith – Lord Koos Records KLP 1

References

1929 births
British jazz saxophonists
British male saxophonists
Jamaican reggae musicians
Jamaican ska musicians
Living people
Soul-jazz saxophonists
The Foundations members
21st-century saxophonists
British male jazz musicians